The Pennsylvania Mock Trial Competition is a high school Mock Trial competition in Pennsylvania sponsored by the Pennsylvania Bar Association Young Lawyers Division. The winning school of the state finals advances to the National High School Mock Trial Championship. The Pennsylvania Mock Trial Competition first began in 1984. The case material is usually released early in November, within the first two weeks. Typically, 250 to 300 teams compete each year making it one of the largest state competitions in the country. The Statewide Championship is held each year in late March at the Dauphin County Courthouse in Harrisburg, Pennsylvania and consists of the top 12 to 16 teams in the state. As a result of the COVID-19 Pandemic, the 2020 Statewide Championship was cancelled and the entire 2021 and 2022 competition seasons were held virtually.

Trial Format

Opening Statements
A trial starts with a 5-minute opening statement by the Plaintiff/Prosecution (depending on whether the case is civil or criminal, respectively), which is immediately followed by a 5-minute opening statement by the defense.

Witness Testimony
After opening statements, the plaintiff/prosecution calls its first witness. The plaintiff/prosecution conducts a direct examination of the witness, and then defense conducts a cross examination of the same witness. After cross-examination, plaintiff/prosecution has the opportunity to conduct a redirect examination of the witness. If they do, defense is given the chance to recross the witness. After either all four types of exams have been conducted or one party abstains from doing redirect or recross respectively, the witness steps down from the stand. This process is then repeated for two more plaintiff/prosecution witnesses. With the conclusion of testimony from the third plaintiff witness, the plaintiff rests. The Defense then calls three witnesses in the same manner described above for the plaintiff/prosecution.

Each team has 30 minutes for witness testimony, including all direct, cross, redirect, and recross examinations conducted by counsel of that team. (The clock does stop, however, for a variety of reasons, including, but not limited to, objections and parts of the process for entering exhibits.)

Closing Arguments
Once the third defense witness has finished giving testimony, the defense gives their closing argument. Like opening statements, closing arguments are limited to 5 minutes apiece. After defense closes, plaintiff/prosecution gives its closing statement. This is a deviation from standard courtroom procedure, in which the plaintiff/prosecution closes first, followed by the defense, after which the plaintiff/prosecution may offer a rebuttal. In Mock Trial, this deviation allows each team to have the opportunity to speak first, one for opening statements and one for closing arguments. Barring any disputes being raised, the second closing argument marks the conclusion of the trial, and the jury is dismissed to tally points.

Scoring & Winner
Each member of the jury scores each part of the trial based on specific scoring categories, such as the flow of a direct examination or the effectiveness of a cross-examination. Each opening statement or closing argument is worth a maximum of 10 points. Each direct or cross-examination is also worth, at most, 10 points. Each witness can earn a maximum of 10 points independent of any other points from direct examination. There is one team evaluation category scored at the end of the trial, valued at a maximum of 10 points. Therefore, each team can earn up to 120 points during the trial.

On any juror's ballot, the team with more points is the winner of that scoresheet. Each juror indicates which team he/she would choose to win if the points of the scoresheet after any penalties are assessed, adds up to a tie. Each scoresheet is worth one vote. Whichever team receives more votes is declared the winner of the trial. If there is an even number of jurors and they have a split decision, the team with total points on all of the scoresheets is the winner.

Past Cases

State Finals Results

Schools with Multiple Appearances

References

External links
Pennsylvania High School Mock Trial

Moot court competitions
Events in Pennsylvania
1984 establishments in the United States